D'Arcy Corrigan (2 January 1870 – 25 December 1945) was an Irish lawyer who became an American film character actor.

Life and career
D'Arcy Corrigan was born in County Cork, playing over 50 film roles from 1925–1945. His early career included a stint as private secretary for a member of Parliament and as a stock company leading man. Corrigan had a distinguished appearance with his wrinkled, gaunt face; his roles typically were very brief but memorable. Corrigan was memorable as the odd morgue-keeper in Bela Lugosi's Murders in the Rue Morgue (1932) and as a blind man in The Informer (1935) by John Ford. He portrayed the ominously silent, darkly shrouded Spirit of Christmas Future in the popular 1938 MGM film A Christmas Carol.

Most of his later roles were mostly small and uncredited, such as the thoughtful Professor LaTouche in the first scene of Bringing Up Baby.

Last years and death
Corrigan retired from acting widely in 1940 (except for one small role in Adventure in 1945) and died on Christmas Day in 1945, in Los Angeles, aged 75.

Filmography

Credited

 Double Action Daniels (1925) - Richard Booth
 Lady Robinhood (1925) - Padre
 Ella Cinders (1926) - Editor
 Tarzan and the Golden Lion (1927) - Weesimbo
 Wild Geese (1927) - Mr. Klovatz
 Napoleon's Barber (1928, Short) - Tailor
 The Last Warning (1928) - John Woodford
 The Man from Blankley's (1930) - Mr. Ditchwater
 Murders in the Rue Morgue (1932) - Morgue Keeper
 The Informer (1935) - The Blind Man
 Rosia de Francia (1935) - El inquisidor general
 Mary of Scotland (1936) - Kirkcaldy
 The Plough and the Stars (1936) - Priest
 All Over Town (1937) - Davenport
 A Christmas Carol (1938) - Spirit of Christmas Future
 The Man in the Iron Mask (1939) - Tortured Prisoner
 The Great Commandment (1939) - Blind Man

Uncredited

 The Merry Widow (1925) - Horatio
 My Old Dutch (1926) - Minor Role
 Exit Smiling (1926) - Macomber
 The Man Who Laughs (1928) - Minor Role
 Law and Order (1932) - Undertaker Parker
 Diplomaniacs (1933) - Ship's Passenger
 Morning Glory (1933) - Minor Role
 The Invisible Man (1933) - Villager
 We Live Again (1934) - Juror
 Clive of India (1935) - Merchant
 Mystery of Edwin Drood (1935) - Opium Addict
 I'll Love You Always (1935) - Waiter
 Bride of Frankenstein (1935) - Procession Leader
 The Arizonian (1935) - Actor Playing Hamlet
 Steamboat Round the Bend (1935) - Hangman
 Metropolitan (1935) - Broken Down Actor
 A Feather in Her Hat (1935) - Cockney Man
 Klondike Annie (1936) - Missionary
 Show Boat (1936) - Minor Role
 Fatal Lady (1936) - Brazilian Opera Troupe
 Ramona (1936) - Jeff
 Lloyd's of London (1936) - Chimney Sweep
 The Road Back (1937) - Cab Driver
 Parnell (1937) - Irish Party Committeeman
 The Prisoner of Zenda (1937) - Traveler
 It Happened in Hollywood (1937) - Shakespearean Actor
 Stage Door (1937) - Minor Role
 Conquest (1937) - Priest
 Merry-Go-Round of 1938 (1937) - Actor
 Frisco-Express (1937) - Preacher
 Wise Girl (1937) - Flute Seller
 Bringing Up Baby (1938) - Professor LaTouche
 Goodbye Broadway (1938) - Shakespearean Character
 The Adventures of Robin Hood (1938) - Villager
 The Toy Wife (1938) - Suitor
 $1,000 a Touchdown (1939) - Cecil
 The Night of Nights (1939) - Actor
 Adventure (1945) - Man in Library (final film role)

References

External links

1870 births
1945 deaths
American male film actors
20th-century Irish male actors
People from County Cork
19th-century Irish lawyers
Irish emigrants to the United States